The Way of Lost Souls is a 1929 British drama film directed by Paul Czinner and starring Pola Negri, Warwick Ward and Hans Rehmann. It is also known by the alternative title The Woman He Scorned. Location shooting was done in the far west of Cornwall around St Ives, Penzance and Helford. It was the first film made in Britain by Czinner.

Premise
A prostitute and a lighthouse keeper fall in love.

Cast
 Pola Negri - Louise 
 Warwick Ward -  Maxim 
 Hans Rehmann - John 
 Cameron Carr - Magistrate 
 Margaret Rawlings - Woman

References

External links

1929 films
Films directed by Paul Czinner
1929 drama films
British drama films
British black-and-white films
Films with screenplays by Paul Czinner
Films shot in Cornwall
Films shot at British International Pictures Studios
1920s English-language films
1920s British films